The Lekiu-class frigates are a class of frigates of the Royal Malaysian Navy. They are the largest and most modern surface combatants of the Royal Malaysian Navy, until the Maharaja Lela-class frigates are completed. The class comprises two vessels,  and KD Lekiu. The class is named after the second ship of the class which was launched before Jebat.

The two ships of the class are named after Hang Lekiu and Hang Jebat, two figures from the Malay 15th-century epic narrative Hikayat Hang Tuah. They share this characteristic with the two s, KD Kasturi and KD Lekir, as well as the old frigate-turned-training ship , all of which are named after figures from the epic as well.

Development
The ships were built in the United Kingdom by Yarrow Shipbuilders of Glasgow (now BAE Systems Surface Ships) from the company's standard F2000 frigate design. Lekiu was launched in December 1994 while the Jebat was launched in May 1995. Jebat carries the lower pennant number (FFG29) to signify the seniority of this ship, which accommodates the Admiral of the Royal Malaysian Navy. (Hang Jebat succeeded Hang Tuah as Laksamana (Admiral) during the Melaka Sultanate, while Hang Lekiu was never made a Laksamana.)

The purchase of the two ships of the Lekiu class involved a major transfer of technology programme and an offset programme where some portion of the contract value would involve purchases and services contracted to Malaysian companies.

Delivery and operational status were delayed due to integration of combat systems problems. The ships were commissioned in March and May 1999.

Both Jebat and Lekiu serve in the 23 Frigate Squadron of the Royal Malaysian Navy.

Delays
The Lekiu class faced serious delays due to difficulties in the systems integration of the weapons and weapons control system (i.e., software problems). These problems were overcome and the delivery and commissioning of the two ships was completed on 7 October and 10 November 1999.

Plans for further ships

Malaysian Minister of Defence Najib Tun Razak announced at the 2006 Farnborough Air Show that Malaysia would be buying two frigates from the United Kingdom under Project Brave. The Evening Times reported on 20 July 2006 that the Clyde shipyard has won a contract to build two Lekiu class warships for Malaysia.

The two ships were to have been completed at Labuan Shipyard as a condition of the deal, but were cancelled in August 2009. In 2013 Malaysia announced the purchasing of six Maharaja Lela-class frigates, and the Lekiu class batch 2 is presumed to be cancelled.

Service Life Extension Program (SLEP)
A limited service life extension program started in 2015. Upgrades include Thales Vigile 100 Mk2 ESM replacing the BAE Mentor A, Chess Dynamics Sea Eagle FCEO replacing the BAE Type V 3001 and Terma Scanter 6000 navigation radar.

Major operation
KD Lekiu together with KD Sri Inderapura involved in Ops Fajar 4 mission/Anti-piracy measures in Somalia by Malaysian navy in Gulf of Aden in 2008. Both ships were tasked to return two hijacked Malaysian International Shipping Corporation (MISC) shipping vessels MT Bunga Melati Dua and MT Bunga Melati Lima to Malaysia.

In 2013 KD Jebat was involved in a naval blockade in 2013 Lahad Datu standoff.

In 2014, KD Lekiu involved in MH370's Search and Rescue Operation in the South Indian Ocean for several months.

In 2018, KD Lekiu participated in the world's largest maritime exercise RIMPAC.

Ships of the class

Gallery

See also
  – Three other F2000-derived ships ordered for the Royal Brunei Navy but purchased by the Indonesian Navy.
 List of naval ship classes in service

References

External links

 Lekiu Class, Malaysia(naval technology)
 photograph of KD Lekiu
 photograph of KD Lekiu
 photograph of the Jebat at Yarrow Shipbuilders
 another photograph of the Lekiu
 navy rating manning the Nautis II Command system

Frigate classes